Bawana Assembly constituency is one of the seventy Delhi assembly constituencies of Delhi in northern India.
Bawana assembly constituency is a part of North West Delhi Lok Sabha constituency.

Members of Legislative Assembly
Key

Election results

2020

2017 By Poll results

2015

2013

2008

2003

1998

1993

See also
 First Legislative Assembly of Delhi
 Second Legislative Assembly of Delhi
 Third Legislative Assembly of Delhi
 Fourth Legislative Assembly of Delhi
 Fifth Legislative Assembly of Delhi
 Sixth Legislative Assembly of Delhi

Notes and references
Notes

References

Assembly constituencies of Delhi
Delhi Legislative Assembly